Guo Yingqiu (1909–1985) was a Chinese politician and educator.

Biography
Guo Yingqiu was born in Tongshan County, Jiangsu in 1909. He was the Governor of Yunnan and the President of Nanjing University and Renmin University.

External links
Introduction to Guo Yingqiu

1909 births
1985 deaths
Presidents of Renmin University of China
Politicians from Xuzhou
Presidents of Nanjing University
Governors of Yunnan
People's Republic of China politicians from Jiangsu
Chinese Communist Party politicians from Jiangsu